John Gerard Bruton (born 18 May 1947) is an Irish former Fine Gael politician who served as Taoiseach from 1994 to 1997, Ambassador of the European Union to the United States from 2004 to 2009, Leader of Fine Gael from 1990 to 2001, Leader of the Opposition from 1990 to 1994 and 1997 to 2001, Deputy Leader of Fine Gael from 1987 to 1990, Minister for the Public Service from January 1987 to March 1987, Minister for Finance from 1981 to 1982 and 1986 to 1987, Minister for Industry, Trade, Commerce and Tourism from 1983 to 1986, Minister for Industry and Energy from 1982 to 1983, Parliamentary Secretary to the Minister for Education and Parliamentary Secretary to the Minister for Industry and Commerce from 1973 to 1977. He served as a Teachta Dála (TD) from 1969 to 2004.

He led a Rainbow Coalition government of Fine Gael–Labour–Democratic Left.

Bruton was first elected to Dáil Éireann as a TD for the Meath constituency in 1969, and served continuously until his retirement from domestic politics in 2004. He served as the Ambassador of the European Union to the United States from 2004 to 2009, and is a former vice-president of the European People's Party (EPP).

Early and personal life
John Gerard Bruton was born to a wealthy, Catholic farming family in Dunboyne, County Meath, and educated at Clongowes Wood College.

Oliver Coogan notes in his Politics and War in Meath 1913–23 that Bruton's granduncle was one of the farmers in south Meath who prevented the traditionally Anglo-Irish ascendency hunt from proceeding in the area during the Irish War of Independence.

Bruton later went on to study at University College Dublin (UCD), where he received an honours Bachelor of Arts degree and qualified as a barrister from King's Inns, but never went on to practice law. Bruton was narrowly elected to Dáil Éireann in the 1969 general election, as a Fine Gael TD for Meath. At the age of 22, he was one of the youngest ever members of the Dáil at that time. He more than doubled his vote in the 1973 general election, which brought Fine Gael to power as part of the National Coalition with the Labour Party. Bruton was appointed Parliamentary Secretary to the Minister for Industry and Commerce and to the Minister for Education, in the National Coalition in 1973. He remained in office until 1977.

He is married to Finola Bruton (née Gill) and they have four children.

Shadow cabinet and in government
Following Fine Gael's defeat at the 1977 general election, Bruton was appointed to the new front bench as Spokesperson on Agriculture by its new leader, Garret FitzGerald. He was later promoted as Spokesperson for Finance, making a particular effective speech in the Dáil in response to the budget of 1980. He played a prominent role in Fine Gael's campaign in the 1981 general election, which resulted in another coalition with the Labour Party, with FitzGerald as Taoiseach. Bruton received a huge personal vote in Meath, and at the age of only 34 was appointed Minister for Finance, the most senior position in the cabinet. The new government had to abandon its election promises to cut taxes in the light of overwhelming economic realities. The government collapsed unexpectedly on the night of 27 January 1982, when Bruton's controversial budget was defeated in the Dáil. The previously supportive Independent Socialist TD Jim Kemmy, voted against the budget, which proposed among other things the introduction of VAT on children's shoes, thus causing the Dáil to be dissolved and Fine Gael to lose power.

First leadership bid
The minority Fianna Fáil government which followed only lasted until November 1982, when Fine Gael once again returned to power in a coalition government with the Labour Party, but when the new government was formed, Bruton was moved from Finance to become Minister for Industry and Energy. After a reconfiguration of government departments in 1983, Bruton became Minister for Industry, Trade, Commerce and Tourism. In a cabinet reshuffle in 1986, Bruton was appointed again as Minister for Finance. Although he was Minister for Finance, Bruton never presented his budget. The Labour Party withdrew from the government due to a disagreement over his budget proposals leading to the collapse of the government and another election.

Following the 1987 general election Fine Gael suffered a heavy defeat. Garret FitzGerald resigned as leader immediately, and a leadership contest ensued between Alan Dukes, Peter Barry and Bruton himself. The exact result of the vote was not published. This was a severe blow as the victor, Dukes, was, like Bruton, one of the younger generation of politicians (albeit a couple of years older than Bruton), but had been a TD for 12 years fewer. Bruton was of on Fine Gael's right wing, whereas Dukes was in FitzGerald's social democratic and liberal mould. Dukes was perceived to be a lacklustre leader however, who alienated his party's TDs and Senators and made little progress in recovering the ground lost by Fine Gael in 1987. His Tallaght Strategy where he stated that he would support Fianna Fáil on economic reforms was also unpopular. The disastrous performance in the 1990 presidential election in which the party finished in a then humiliating and unprecedented third in a national election, proved to be the final straw for the party and Dukes was forced to resign as leader shortly after. Bruton, who was the deputy leader of Fine Gael at the time, was unopposed in the ensuing leadership election.

Leadership of Fine Gael
Whereas Dukes came from the social democratic wing of Fine Gael, Bruton came from the more conservative wing. However to the surprise of critics and of conservatives, in his first policy initiative he called for a referendum on a Constitutional amendment permitting the enactment of legislation allowing for divorce in Ireland.

Fine Gael had been in decline for nearly a decade; from the high point of the November 1982 general election when it achieved 70 seats in Dáil Éireann (only five seats short of Fianna Fáil's total). The party had lost a considerable number of seats over the following ten years. Following the inexperienced Dukes' disastrous period of leadership, Bruton's election was seen as offering Fine Gael a chance to rebuild under a far more politically experienced leader. However Bruton's perceived right wing persona and his rural background was used against him by critics and particularly by the media.

By the 1992 general election, the anti-Fianna Fáil mood in the country produced a major swing to the opposition, but that support went to the Labour Party, not Bruton's Fine Gael, which actually lost a further 10 seats.  Even then, it initially appeared that Fine Gael was in a position to form a government. However, negotiations stalled in part from Labour's refusal to be part of a coalition which would include the libertarian Progressive Democrats, as well as Bruton's unwillingness to take Democratic Left into a prospective coalition. The Labour Party broke off talks with Fine Gael and opted to enter a new coalition with Fianna Fáil. It was a humiliating blow to Bruton, as the Labour Party was always seen as a natural ally of Fine Gael rather than Fianna Fáil. Fine Gael, and Bruton personally, continued to perform poorly in opinion polls throughout 1993 and early 1994, Bruton narrowly survived a challenge to his leadership in early 1994. However a couple of by-election victories, and a good performance in the 1994 European elections, coupled with a disastrous showing by the Labour Party, shored up his position.

In late 1994, the government of Fianna Fáil's Albert Reynolds collapsed. Bruton was able to persuade Labour to end its coalition with Fianna Fáil and enter a new coalition government with Fine Gael and Democratic Left. Bruton faced charges of hypocrisy for agreeing to enter government with Democratic Left, as Fine Gael campaigned in the 1992 general election on a promise not to enter government with the party. Nevertheless, on 15 December, aged 47, Bruton became the then youngest ever Taoiseach. This was the first time in the history of the state that a new government was installed without a general election being held.

Taoiseach (1994–1997)

Bruton's politics were markedly different from most Irish leaders. Whereas most leaders had come from or identified with the independence movement Sinn Féin (in its 1917–22 phase), Bruton identified more with the more moderate Irish Parliamentary Party (IPP) tradition that Sinn Féin had eclipsed at the 1918 general election. He hung a picture of IPP leader John Redmond, his political hero, on a wall in his office as Taoiseach, in preference to other figures such as Patrick Pearse. But as evidence of Bruton's complexity, he also kept a picture of former Fianna Fáil Taoiseach Seán Lemass, which had been hung there by Reynolds, and which Bruton kept because he viewed Lemass as the best and most reforming Taoiseach in the history of the state.

Continued developments in the Northern Ireland peace process and his attitude to Anglo-Irish relations came to define Bruton's tenure as Taoiseach. In February 1995, he launched the Anglo-Irish 'Framework Document' with the British Prime Minister, John Major. This document outlined new proposed relations between Ireland, Northern Ireland and the United Kingdom. Many of Bruton's opponents considered him to be too willing to accommodate unionist demands (in one famous accusation, Albert Reynolds referred to him as "John Unionist"). However, he took a strongly critical position on the British Government's reluctance to engage with Sinn Féin during the IRA's 1994–1997 ceasefire. Bruton complained to a local radio reporter in Cork that "I am sick of answering questions about the fucking peace process", for which he later apologised.

Bruton also established a working relationship with Gerry Adams of Sinn Féin, however both were mutually distrustful of each other. The relationship became frayed following the ending of the ceasefire in 1996, resulting in a bomb explosion in London. These relations worsened when the IRA killed Jerry McCabe, a member of the Garda Síochána, in a botched post office robbery in County Limerick, and another bomb explosion in Manchester. However, Bruton received widespread praise in the Republic for condemning the Royal Ulster Constabulary for yielding to loyalist threats at Drumcree by allowing members of the Orange Order to parade through a nationalist district. He stated that the RUC had been neither impartial nor consistent in applying the law. His outrage and criticism led to a tense atmosphere between London and Dublin. By the time of the 1997 general election Sinn Féin stated that they would prefer a Fianna Fáil led government and the IRA resumed their ceasefire soon after Fine Gael lost the 1997 general election.

He also presided over a successful Irish Presidency of the European Union in 1996, and helped finalise the Stability and Growth Pact, which establishes macroeconomic parameters for countries participating in the single European currency, the euro. Bruton was the fifth Irish leader to address a joint session of the United States Congress on 11 September 1996, as the 30th head of state or government of an EU country to do so since 1945.

Bruton's government suffered from some allegations of corruption, and political embarrassment. In 1996, the Minister for Transport, Energy and Communication, Michael Lowry, resigned from the cabinet after allegations that he had not paid income tax on payments from the supermarket tycoon, Ben Dunne, for work he had done for him as a businessman prior to becoming a Minister. His Minister of State at the Department of Finance also resigned, on 9 February 1995, as a result of leaks from the Department of Finance. Additionally, many years later Frank Dunlop made allegations before the planning tribunal that he had informed Bruton about demands for a £250,000 bribe made to him by a Fine Gael Dublin City Councillor, Tom Hand, to rezone the Quarryvale development. Dunlop testified that when he informed Bruton of the bribery attempts, Bruton replied, "There are no angels in the world or in Fine Gael". Bruton vehemently denied this and Fine Gael counsel told the Planning Tribunal in 2003: "I refute [sic] entirely Mr Dunlop's contention that he advised me then of the alleged demand made to him by the late Tom Hand". However, following further evidence at the tribunal, Bruton returned to it in October 2007, and conceded that "it gradually came back to me", that Dunlop, "did say to me something about a Councillor looking for money". But, in his own evidence to the tribunal in 2007, Dunlop himself said that he had not mentioned any figure of 250,000 to Bruton in his 1993 conversation with him.

Bruton presided over the first official visit by a member of the British Royal Family since 1912, by Charles, Prince of Wales. His welcome speech to Prince Charles, was viewed by many journalists negatively in Ireland. In Britain, The Times accused him of being "embarrassingly effusive" while The Guardian lambasted that Bruton get a grip on his "extravagantly nonsensical attitudes". Bruton himself viewed the fact that the heir to the British throne could visit the Republic successfully, as marking an important turning point in Anglo-Irish relations and stands over the comments he made as appropriate in the circumstances.

Following the murder of crime journalist Veronica Guerin, his government established the Criminal Assets Bureau.

Post-Taoiseach period
The government was widely expected to win re-election in 1997. While Fine Gael gained nine seats, Labour was severely mauled, losing 16 seats. This left Bruton far short of the parliamentary support he needed to retain office, and he resigned. A Fianna Fáil–Progressive Democrat coalition led by Bertie Ahern came into power, with Bruton reverting to leadership of the opposition.

Fine Gael became paralysed in opposition. Bruton was deposed from leadership in 2001, in favour of Michael Noonan, due in part to fears Fine Gael would suffer severe losses in the 2002 election. However, Noonan failed to live up to expectations and the party suffered an even greater collapse than had been expected under Bruton. Having gone into the election expecting to increase its seat count from 54 to 60, it only won 31. This not only tied Fine Gael's second-worst performance in an election, but was 39 seats fewer than at its high point twenty years earlier in 1982.

Bruton, a passionate supporter of European integration, was chosen as one of the two Irish Parliament Representatives to the European Convention, which helped draft the proposed European Constitution. He was one of two National Parliament Representatives to sit on the 12-member Praesidium, which helped steer the European Convention. He is a member of the Comite d'Honneur of the Institute of International and European Affairs, along with Peter Sutherland and Bertie Ahern. He accepted an offer to become European Union Ambassador to the United States, in the summer of 2004, and after resigning from the Dáil on 31 October 2004, he assumed that office. Bruton was praised by Ahern, who said Bruton had played "a pivotal role in developing Ireland's relations with the European Union."

Bruton received an Honorary Doctorate from Memorial University of Newfoundland in 2003, and from the University of Missouri in 2009.

He regularly lectures at national and international universities. In early 2004, he accepted a position as Adjunct Faculty Member in the School of Law and Government at Dublin City University. In November 2008, he received the Order of the Polar Star award from the Government of Sweden.

His brother, Richard Bruton, is also a Fine Gael politician, and has served in a number of ministerial roles, most recently as Minister for Communications, Climate Action and Environment.

On 29 October 2009, it was announced that he had written to the Ambassadors to the United States of the 27 members of the European Union expressing his interest in applying for the position of President of the European Council following implementation of the Lisbon Treaty. Bruton was very much an outside shot for the position as EU leaders firmly indicated they want a chairman-style president rather than a high-profile figurehead to fill the post. Herman Van Rompuy, the then Belgian Prime Minister, was appointed President of the European Council on 19 November 2009 and took office on 1 December 2009.

On 21 May 2010, it was announced that he would be the chairman of the newly formed financial services body, IFSC Ireland. His main role will be to promote Ireland as a location of choice for international financial services.

Bruton was widely discussed as a candidate for the 2011 presidential election and was approached by Fine Gael with the opportunity to become their candidate; on 28 May 2011, however, Bruton issued a statement that he was "flattered" to be asked, but would not be a candidate for the presidency.

Since November 2011, Bruton acts as an advisor to Fair Observer focusing mainly on the areas of politics, finance and economics as well as on issues pertaining to Europe.

Bruton receives annual pension payments of €141,849.

In September 2014, on the 100th anniversary of the signing of the Home Rule Bill, Bruton said the 1916 Easter Rising was a mistake and an unjust war.

Bruton supported the "No" campaign during the 2018 Irish referendum on abortion.

Government
24th Government of Ireland (December 1994 – June 1997)

References

External links
Washington Diplomat Bio

1947 births
Living people
Alumni of University College Dublin
Ambassadors of the European Union to the United States
Fine Gael TDs
Institute of European Affairs
Leaders of Fine Gael
Members of the 19th Dáil
Members of the 20th Dáil
Members of the 21st Dáil
Members of the 22nd Dáil
Members of the 23rd Dáil
Members of the 24th Dáil
Members of the 25th Dáil
Members of the 26th Dáil
Members of the 27th Dáil
Members of the 28th Dáil
Members of the 29th Dáil
Ministers for Finance (Ireland)
Ministers for Transport (Ireland)
Order of the Polar Star
Parliamentary Secretaries of the 20th Dáil
People educated at Clongowes Wood College
Politicians from County Meath
European People's Party politicians
Presidents of the European Council
Taoisigh
Irish officials of the European Union
Ministers for Enterprise, Trade and Employment